Somatochlora graeseri is a species of dragonfly in the family Corduliidae. It is found in Asia, where it occurs in Japan (Hokkaido and northern Honshu), Korea, northern China, and Russia (Siberia west to foothills of the Ural Mountains).

References

Corduliidae
Insects described in 1887